"" ("God of Justice") is the national anthem of Serbia, as defined by the Article 7 of the Constitution of Serbia. "Bože pravde" was the state anthem of the Kingdom of Serbia until 1919 when Serbia became a part of the Kingdom of Serbs, Croats and Slovenes. It was re-adopted as the national anthem at first by the parliamentary recommendation on the use in 2004 and then constitutionally sanctioned in 2006, after Serbia became independent again.

History

After the assassination of Prince Mihailo, Milan Obrenović came to the throne in 1872, celebrating his coming of age. Then he ordered a play from the manager of the National Theater in Belgrade, Jovan Đorđević, who quickly wrote and presented the play Marko kazuje na kome je carstvo (Marko names the Emperor), with the aim of glorifying Serbian history and the Obrenović dynasty, and Bože pravde, composed by Davorin Jenko. Đorđević's song quickly gained more popularity among the people than the piece itself, and in 1882, on the occasion of Milan's enthronement as Serbian king, Đorđević reworked the text and so his new version became the first official anthem of Serbia. In 1903, after the May Coup, the Obrenović dynasty died out and the Karađorđevićs came to the helm of Serbia. The new Serbian king Peter I wanted to change the state symbols, even the anthem. The Austrian composer from Vienna, August Stol, composed a song for the Serbian king. Peter did not like the composition. Various competitions in which many Serbian poets (Aleksa Šantić among others) participated were also unsuccessful. In the end, in 1909, it was decided to make the anthem Bože pravde official again, with minor changes to the text.
While being the national anthem of the Kingdom of Serbia, it occasionally was referred to as the Serbian national Prayer. Various rulers of Serbia changed the words of the anthem to suit them. During the rule of Prince Milan I of Serbia, the words were "God, save Prince Milan" (knez Milana Bože spasi), which changed to King Milan when Serbia became a kingdom. Later it was tailored to Peter I and Alexander I as well. During the time of the Kingdom of Serbs, Croats and Slovenes (which later became the Kingdom of Yugoslavia), "Bože pravde" was part of its national anthem. On the eve of the World War II, at the great international gathering of the Music Confederation, held in Paris, this anthem was declared one of the three most beautiful in the world.

"Bože pravde" anthem was officially abandoned after liberation of the country at the end of World War II in 1945, in favour of "Hey, Slavs", under its Serbo-Croatian title Hej, Sloveni, which was the national anthem of Socialist Federal Republic of Yugoslavia for 47 years, from 1945 to 1992. After the break-up of Yugoslavia in 1991-1992, only Serbia and Montenegro remained in the federation i.e. the newly-formed Serbia and Montenegro, but since no agreement over the anthem could be reached, "Hey, Slavs" remained the national anthem. Many Serbs disliked the song during this period and booed it whenever it was played, such as at sporting events. In 1992, "Vostani Serbije" and "Marš na Drinu" were proposed as the regional anthem of Serbia along with "Bоže pravde". The latter, promulgated by then-ruling Socialist Party of Serbia, even received a plurality of popular vote on referendum, but was never officially adopted.

The recommendation on the use of "Bože pravde" was adopted unanimously by the Parliament of Serbia in 2004 and constitutionally sanctioned in 2006, after Serbia restored independence, while the recommended text was promulgated into the law in 2009. 
It utilizes slightly modified original lyrics, asserting that Serbia is no longer a monarchy — four verses are different. In three, "Serbian king" (srpskog kralja) is changed to "Serbian lands" (srpske zemlje) and in one, "God save the Serbian king" (srpskog kralja Bože spasi, literally "The Serbian king, O God, save") is changed to "O God, save; O God, defend" (Bože spasi, Bože brani).

"Bože pravde" was also used as the regional anthem of the Republika Srpska, a constituency of Bosnia and Herzegovina until 2006, when it was ruled down by the country's constitutional court for being unconstitutional and the decision was upheld by the Constitutional Court of Republika Srpska.

Lyrics 

The full Serbian national anthem as officially defined consists of eight stanzas, but usually only the first two are performed on public occasions for reasons of brevity. The third verse is also usually omitted in full performances.

See also 
 List of Serbian anthems

Notes

References

External links 

 Serbian anthem streaming audio, lyrics and info (archive link)
 National Assembly of the Republic of Serbia - Important Documents

European anthems
Royal anthems
National anthems
National symbols of Serbia
Anthems of Serbia
Principality of Serbia
Kingdom of Serbia
Serbian culture
Culture of Republika Srpska
Serbian patriotic songs
Articles containing video clips
National anthem compositions in B-flat major
1872 compositions
1872 poems
1872 songs